Suzana Ardeleanu ( Suzana Tași; born 8 March 1946) is a Romanian fencer. She competed in the women's individual and team foil events at the 1980 Summer Olympics.

Career
Ardeleanu learnt fencing at a local club under coach Alexandru Csipler. She transferred in 1964 along with Ecaterina Iencic and Ileana Gyulai to CSA Steaua București, which are related to the football team Steaua Bucharest, where she was trained by Andrei Vâlcea. Along with Olga Szabo, Maria Vicol, Ana Ene-Derșidan and Ileana Gyulai, she became team world champion at the 1969 World Fencing Championships in Havana.

She retired as an athlete after the 1980 Summer Olympics and became a fencing coach in Satu Mare along with her husband, foil fencer Ștefan Ardeleanu.

References

External links
 

1946 births
Living people
Romanian female foil fencers
Olympic fencers of Romania
Fencers at the 1980 Summer Olympics
Sportspeople from Satu Mare